This article is a list of recordings made by Judy Garland. Throughout her career Garland recorded numerous soundtracks for her films, as well as studio recordings for Decca, Columbia and Capitol Records. In addition to these soundtrack and studio recordings, Garland would also perform numerous songs on her 1963–1964 CBS television series, The Judy Garland Show, with an array of famous guest performers. Garland also performed countless times on the radio and gave hundreds of concerts throughout her career, many of these performances were recorded and have survived in audio format.

Soundtrack recordings (1929–1967)

Decca recordings (1935–1947)

Columbia recordings (1953)

Capitol recordings (1955–1964)

The Judy Garland Show recordings (1963–1964)

Radio recordings (1935–1961)
For a list of theatrical radio performances, see: Radio appearances

Live recordings (1941–1969)

Chorus Intro
Call the Press
Medley:a) You Haven't Lived Until You've Played the Palaceb) Shine On, Harvest Moonc) My Mand) Some of These Dayse) I Don't Care
Rock-a-Bye Your Baby with a Dixie Melody
Medley:a) You Made Me Love Youb) For Me and My Galc) The Boy Next Doord) The Trolley Song
Chorus Interlude
Get Happy
A Couple of Swells
Love
A Pretty Girl Milking Her Cow
Liza (All the Clouds'll Roll Away)
After You've Gone
Over the Rainbow
Auld Lang Syne
Available on Wiley Entertainment, Ltd./BCD/MSL Partners 1998 release Judy Duets.

Overture
When You're Smiling (The Whole World Smiles with You)
Day In, Day Out
I Can't Give You Anything But Love
Zing! Went the Strings of My Heart
Purple People Eater
Medley:a) You Made Me Love You b) For Me and My Galc) The Trolley Song
Do It Again
When the Sun Comes Out
Rock-A-Bye Your Baby with a Dixie Melody
Over the Rainbow
After You've Gone
A Pretty Girl Milking Her Cow
Swanee
Originally released in 1958 by Capitol Records as Garland at the Grove.

Overture
Zing! Went the Strings of My Heart
Medley:a) You Made Me Love Youb) For Me and My Galc) The Trolley Song
I Can't Give You Anything But Love
Come Rain or Come Shine
San Francisco
The Man That Got Away
When You're Smiling (The Whole World Smiles With You)
Stormy Weather
You Go to My Head
That's Entertainment!
Medley:a) I Love Parisb) April in Paris
Rock-a-Bye Your Baby with a Dixie Melody
After You've Gone
Over the Rainbow
Swanee
Available on Europe 1/RTE Records 1994 release Judy Garland à Paris.

Overture
When You're Smiling (The Whole World Smiles With You)
Medley:a) Almost Like Being in Loveb) This Can't Be Love
Do It Again
You Go to My Head
Alone Together
Who Cares (As Long as You Care for Me)
Puttin' On the Ritz
How Long Has This Been Going On?
Just You, Just Me
The Man That Got Away
San Francisco
That's Entertainment!
I Can't Give You Anything But Love
Come Rain or Come Shine
You're Nearer
If Love Were All
A Foggy Day
Zing! Went the Strings of My Heart
Stormy Weather
Medley:a) You Made Me Love Youb) For Me and My Galc) The Trolley Song
Rock-a-Bye Your Baby with a Dixie Melody
Over the Rainbow
Swanee
It's a Great Day for the Irish
After You've Gone
Chicago
San Francisco
Available on First Hand Records 2012 release The Amsterdam Concert - December 1960

Overture
When You're Smiling (The Whole World Smiles With You)
Medley:a) Almost Like Being in Loveb) This Can't Be Love
Do It Again
You Go to My Head
Alone Together
Who Cares (As Long as You Care for Me)
Puttin' On the Ritz
How Long Has This Been Going On?
Just You, Just Me
The Man That Got Away
San Francisco
That's Entertainment!
I Can't Give You Anything But Love
Come Rain or Come Shine
You're Nearer
A Foggy Day
If Love Were All
Zing! Went the Strings of My Heart
Stormy Weather
Medley:a) You Made Me Love Youb) For Me and My Galc) The Trolley Song
Rock-a-Bye Your Baby with a Dixie Melody
Over the Rainbow
Swanee
After You've Gone
Chicago
Originally released by Capitol Records in 1961 as Judy at Carnegie Hall.

The night of this recording Garland had a bad case of laryngitis and finished only 9 of the 13 scheduled songs. Later that night, after the audience left, she completed "Why Can't I?" and attempted "Do What You Do", but halted it after singing just the verse. 
Sail Away
Something's Coming
Just In Time
Get Me to the Church on Time
Never Will I Marry
Joey, Joey, Joey
Hey, Look Me Over
Some People
The Party's Over
Why Can't I?
Do What You Do 
Originally released by Capitol Records in 1989 as Judy Garland Live!.

with Liza Minnelli.
Overture
Once in a Lifetime 
Maggie, Maggie May 
As Long as He Needs Me 
Just in Time 
It's Yourself 
The Travelin' Life 
Pass That Peace Pipe 
The Gypsy in My Soul 
How Could You Believe Me? 
Maybe This Time 
Hello, Dolly! 
Hello, Dolly! (Reprise) 
Together (Wherever We Go) 
Smile 
Never Will I Marry 
The Man That Got Away 
Medley: a) We Could Make Such Beautiful Music Togetherb) The Best Is Yet to Come
Bob White (Whatcha Gonna Swing Tonight) 
Don't Rain on My Parade 
Medley: a) Take Me Alongb) If I Could Be with Youc) Tea for Twod) Who?e) They Can't Take That Away from Mef) By Myselfg) Take Me Along (Reprise) h) My Mammy
Medley: a) Hooray for Loveb) After You've Gonec) By Myselfd) 'S Wonderfule) How About You?f) Lover, Come Back to Meg) You and the Night and the Musich) It All Depends on You
Make Someone Happy 
Joey, Joey, Joey 
The Music That Makes Me Dance 
I'm All I've Got 
It's Just a Matter of Time 
If I Were in Your Shoes 
What Now, My Love? 
Johnny One Note 
Medley: a) Get Happyb) Happy Days Are Here Again
Medley: a) When the Saints Go Marching Inb) Brotherhood of Man
He's Got the Whole World in His Hands 
Battle Hymn of the Republic 
Rock-a-Bye Your Baby with a Dixie Melody 
Who's Sorry Now? 
Swanee 
Chicago 
Over the Rainbow 
San Francisco 
Originally released by Capitol Records in 1965 as "Live" at the London Palladium.

with Count Basie and His Orchestra
Medley:a) I Hear Musicb) The Sweetest Soundsc) Strike Up the Band
Available on JSP Records 2011 release Swan Songs, First Flights: Her First and Last Recordings.

Overture
For Once in My Life
Medley:a) Almost Like Being in Loveb) This Can't Be Love
Never Will I Marry
How Insensitive
Zing! Went the Strings of My Heart
What Now, My Love?
The Man I Love
Make Someone Happy
Do I Love You?
By Myself
That's Entertainment!
The Man That Got Away
Rock-a-Bye Your Baby with a Dixie Melody
For Once in My Life (Reprise)
Over the Rainbow
Available on JSP Records 2011 release Swan Songs, First Flights: Her First and Last Recordings.

with John Meyer on piano.
I Loved Him, But He Didn't Love Me
For Once in My Life
Available on JSP Records 2011 release Swan Songs, First Flights: Her First and Last Recordings.

Tribute to Harold Arlen, Vincent Youmans, and Noël Coward
The Man That Got Away
It's a New World
Get Happy
Over the Rainbow
Available on JSP Records 2016 release Judy Garland Sings Harold Arlen.

Overture
I Belong to London
Get Happy
The Man That Got Away
I'd Like to Hate Myself in the Morning
Just in Time
Just in Time (Reprise)
Medley:a) You Made Me Love Youb) For Me and My Galc) The Trolley Song
For Once in My Life
San Francisco
Over the Rainbow
Chicago
Additional recordings from Garland's December 30, 1968—February 1, 1969 engagement at Talk of the Town, London, England:
I Belong to London
The Man That Got Away
I'd Like to Hate Myself in the Morning
Medley:a) You Made Me Love Youb) For Me and My Galc) The Trolley Song
Available on JSP Records 2011 release Swan Songs, First Flights: Her First and Last Recordings.

Overture
Get Happy
Just in Time
The Man That Got Away
I'd Like to Hate Myself in the Morning
For Once in My Life
Rock-a-Bye Your Baby with a Dixie Melody
Chicago
Till the Clouds Roll By (with Johnnie Ray)*
Am I Blue? (with Johnny Ray)*
San Francisco
Over the Rainbow
Available on JSP Records 2011 release Swan Songs, First Flights: Her First and Last Recordings. Songs marked with an asterisk (*) are not included on this release because they were discovered, remastered and released for the first time via the Judy Room's YouTube channel in 2017.

See also
Judy Garland discography

References

Judy Garland
Garland, Judy